The Landless People's Movement (LPM) is a political party in Namibia. It is led by former deputy minister of lands and resettlement Bernadus Swartbooi, who serves as its president and chief change campaigner, and Henny Seibeb, the party's deputy leader. The party has four seats in parliament, which are occupied by the Party's President, Bernadus Swartbooi, Mootu Utaara, Isaacks Edison and Seibeb Henry.

History
The Landless People's Movement was formed after Bernadus Swartbooi, deputy minister of land reform, was fired by President Hage Geingob in December 2016 after refusing to apologise to then Land Reform Minister Utoni Nujoma, whom he accused of resettling people from other regions into the south of the country ahead of the Nama.

Policies
Swartbooi has been a vocal advocate of land restitution and restorative justice for landless Namibians who were dispossessed of their land, including indigenous communities. The party also favours LGBT rights, and it plans on addressing the issues of abortion and marijuana legalization. The party's youth wing is the LPM Youth and Student Command Element.

Electoral history

National Assembly elections

References

2018 establishments in Namibia
Agrarian parties
Democratic socialist parties in Africa
Environmentalism in Namibia
Federalist parties
Political parties established in 2018
Political parties in Namibia
Progressive International
Progressive parties
Social democratic parties in Africa
Socialist parties in Namibia